Here, Here and Here is the third studio album by Meg & Dia.  It was released by the Warner Bros. via Sire Records on April 21, 2009.

In contrast to the band's previous release Something Real, here, here and here minimally references literature. The sole exception is the track "Hug me" (née "Hug me till you drug me"), which was inspired by Brave New World. The eponymous closing track references a Mozart quote and narrative in which the composer points to his heart, mind and ears (here, here and here) in order to explain how he wrote his music.

Track listing

The iTunes version has an exclusive 14th track, "What If (Remix)", remixed by Meg Frampton.

Purchasing the album through MegandDia.com includes an instant download of "Agree to Disagree (GarageBand Demo)". The first 1,000 pre-orders also came with an additional autographed booklet. The band's official site offers an exclusive CD/DVD package which includes a 30-minute featurette documenting the making of the album.

Here, Here and Here debuted at number one on the Billboard Heatseekers Chart and number 103 on the Top 200.

"Let's Go Away," "Brightside," and "Giant" were all alternate titles to tracks 01, "Going Away", 09 "The Last Great Star In Hollywood", and 04, "Are There Giants, Too, In The Dance?", respectively.

References

2009 albums
Meg & Dia albums
Albums produced by Howard Benson
Warner Records albums